The First Secretary of the Chinese Communist Party, also referred to the First Secretary of the Secretariat of the Central Committee of the Communist Party of China, is a senior position within the Chinese Communist Party (CCP) and the de facto head of the CCP Secretariat.

The First Secretary is nominated by the CCP Politburo Standing Committee, and is appointed by the CCP Central Committee. It is responsible for the management of directives and day-to-day work of the CCP Secretariat assisting the Party leader. A member of both the Politburo Standing Committee and the Secretariat, the officeholder is often considered the fifth most powerful figure in China's political system — immediately behind the General Secretary of the Central Committee, the Premier of the State Council, the Chair of the National People's Congress and the Chair of the National Consultative Conference.

The two most recent CCP General Secretaries, Hu Jintao and Xi Jinping, were first elevated to the position of first Secretary of the Secretariat in the same process used to determine the membership and roles of the CCP Politburo Standing Committee.

The current officeholder is Cai Qi, who was appointed by a decision of the 20th Politburo on 23 October 2022 to replace Wang Huning, who left office after his re-election as Politburo Standing Committee member.

History 

The office was established at the Party's 8th National Congress in 1956. The position was called “General Secretary” from 1956 to 1966.

During the tenure of the Culture Revolution and Hua Guofeng’s leadership (1969–1980), the CCP Secretariat was abolished. The Secretariat was re-established in 1980 and Hu Yaobang was appointed as it’s General Secretary. The CCP Chairman was replaced by the CCP General Secretary at the Party’s 12th National Congress in 1982, thus the most senior position of the Secretariat has been informally called “First Secretary” or “First ranked Secretary” since 1987.

Officeholders

Notes

See also 
 Secretary-general of the Chinese Communist Party

References 

 
Central Committee of the Chinese Communist Party
Lists of political office-holders in China